Jináb-i-Quddús(c.1820–1849), is the title of Mullá Muḥammad ʻAlí-i-Bárfurúshi, who was the most prominent disciple of the Báb. He was the eighteenth and final Letter of the Living.

Background
Quddús was born some time between years 1815–1822, the variance being due to different sources. The latter date is specified by Nabil in The Dawn-breakers. Amanat [1987] reasons that the most likely date is 1819–1820 as it is in line with other sources.

Quddús was born to a family of rice cultivators in the outskirts of Bárfurúsh. He spent part of his childhood as a house servant of the local Shaykhí leader Mullá Muhammad-Hamza Sharíʻat-madár.

Education
He was sent to the town of Sárí for a madrassa education. Sometime in the mid-1830s he met Mullá Husayn (the first Letter of the Living) and other future Bábís after he joined a small group of students in Mashhad.

When he was eighteen, Quddús left for Karbala and spent four years as a student in Sayyid Kázim's circle. He returned to Bárfurúsh circa 1843.

He was described as a charismatic mullá (religious leader) with "affability, combined with dignity and bearing" and he became a notable person within his hometown. Mírzá Músá, who met him in 1846, said: "whoever was intimately associated with him was seized with an insatiable admiration for the charm of the youth".

As a Bábí
He met the Báb in Shiraz and traveled with him as his companion on pilgrimage to Mecca, leaving Búshihr on the 19th of Ramadán (October, 1844), and arriving in Mecca on the first of Dhi'l-Hájjih (December 12, 1844). During this visit the Báb made his first public declaration, openly challenging Mírzá Muhít-i-Kirmání, one of the most outstanding exponents of the Shaykhí school, and sending a letter conveyed by Quddús to the Sharif of Mecca.

Back in Búshihr (February–March, 1845), the Báb indicated to Quddús that they would never meet again:

"Yours will be the ineffable joy of quaffing the cup of martyrdom for His sake. I, too, shall tread the path of sacrifice, and will join you in the realm of eternity." 
(quoted in The Dawn-Breakers, pg 143)

In Shiraz Quddús experienced his first persecution as a Bábí, when he and Mullá Sádiq had their beards burned, then their noses pierced, and threaded with halters; "then, having been led through the streets in this disgraceful condition, they were expelled from the city." (See God Passes By, pg 11) This incident also made the newspapers eventually echoing in the UK starting November 1, 1845, followed by the US, Australia, and New Zealand. Following his expulsion he travelled across Persia teaching of the new religion, and was one of three major figures in the Conference of Badasht (June–July 1848). One of the most important Babi leaders and regarded by his contemporaries as the exponent of the less radical, more conservative element within the Babi movement, Quddús ostensibly distanced himself from Tahirih's radicalism and break from Islam. However, this was in fact part of what Shoghi Effendi described as "a pre-conceived plan designed to mitigate the alarm and consternation which such a conference was sure to arouse"  and, to the dismay of some Babi's and the appreciation of others, Quddús wholeheartedly embraced Tahirih's radicalism and the two departed Badasht together on the same camel. 

According to Moojan Momen and Todd Lawson, the writings of Quddús,"display a close similarity to that of the Báb in both form and content"

Battle of Fort Tabarsi

From October 10, 1848 to May 10, 1849, the first major military confrontation took place between the Bábís and the local military, instigated by the Islamic clergy. A group of over 200 Bábís were initially attacked by mobs in Bárfurúsh, and fled to the nearby shrine of Shaykh Tabarsi, where they built a defensive fort and received escalating attacks, initially local raids, but later organized imperial regiments. Although the initial clash involved Mullá Husayn, Quddús became the commander of the Bábís upon his arrival at the fort.
 
Over the months that followed, Baháʼí historians describe a number of miraculous events in which a small band of untrained soldiers bore the full brunt of government regiments several times their size, always coming out victorious (see God Passes By, chapter III; and The Dawn-Breakers, chapter XIX). During the last month of the siege the Bábís went without food or water, and survived by consuming shoe leather and ground bones. The battle became an embarrassment to the Persian authorities, and it was ended by the Prince Mihdí-Qulí Mírzá, who sent Quddús a copy of the Qurʼan. On the opening Surah he wrote:
"I swear by this most holy Book, by the righteousness of God who has revealed it, and the Mission of Him who was inspired with its verses, that I cherish no other purpose than to promote peace and friendliness between us. Come forth from your stronghold and rest assured that no hand will be stretched forth against you. You yourself and your companions, I solemnly declare, are under the sheltering protection of the Almighty, of Muhammad, His Prophet, and of Násiriʼd-Dín Sháh, our sovereign. I pledge my honour that no man, either in this army or in this neighbourhood, will ever attempt to assail you. The malediction of God, the omnipotent Avenger, rest upon me if in my heart I cherish any other desire than that which I have stated." 
(The Dawn-Breakers, pg 399)

After leaving the fort, they were gathered in a tent and disarmed, and some taken away as prisoners. The army plundered and destroyed the fort, and then opened fire on the Bábís, killing them all.

Death
Quddús himself was escorted by the prince to Barfurúsh, where the local population was celebrating. The prince's plan was to take his prisoner to Tehran and give him to the Shah. However, the Saʼídu'l-ʻUlamá of Barfurúsh vowed to deny himself food and sleep until such a time as he could kill Quddús with his own hands. The prince arranged a meeting with Quddús and the ʻUlamá, and afterwards handed his prisoner over to them. On 16 May 1849 Quddús was handed over to an angry mob. Nabil records: "By the testimony of Baháʼu'lláh, that heroic youth, who was still on the threshold of his life, was subjected to such tortures and suffered such a death as even Jesus had not faced in the hour of His greatest agony." His body was torn apart and its pieces thrown into a fire. Some pieces were gathered by a friend and interred in a nearby place (see the Taríkh-i-Jadíd, p. 92).

At the time, the Báb was imprisoned in Chihríq, and was so grieved that he stopped writing or dictating for a period of six months.

About two years after the battle of Fort Tabarsi, Abbás-Qulí Khán (the sieging general) was heard describing the battle to a prince, comparing it to the Battle of Karbala, and himself to Shimr Ibn Thil-Jawshan, who slew Imam Husayn.

Station of Quddús
"Regarding the station of Quddus, he should by no means be considered having had the station of a Prophet. His station was no doubt a very exalted one, and far above that of any of the Letters of the Living, including the first Letter, Mulla Husayn. Quddus reflected more than any of the disciples of the Bab the light of His teaching."
(11 November 1936, written on behalf of Shoghi Effendi to an individual believer).

"It may be helpful to consider that in the Dispensation of the Bab, Quddus is referred to as the "Last Point", and the "Last Name of God", is identified, as pointed out in God Passes By, with one of the "Messengers charged with imposture" mentioned in the Qurʼan, and is one of the "two witnesses" into whom "the spirit of life from God" must enter, as attested by 'Abdu'l-Baha in Some Answered Questions, yet, despite these sublime stations, he is not regarded as an independent Manifestation of God."
(24 August 1975, written on behalf of the Universal House of Justice to an individual believer).

References

Further reading 

1820 births
1849 deaths
Letters of the Living
People executed for heresy
Executed Iranian people
19th-century executions by Iran
People executed by dismemberment
People from Mazandaran Province